Vipera eriwanensis, commonly known as the Alburzi viper or the Armenian steppe viper, is a species of venomous snake in the family Viperidae. The species is native to western Asia. There are two recognized subspecies.

Subspecies
There are two subspecies which are recognized as being valid.
 Vipera eriwanensis ebneri 
 Vipera eriwanensis eriwanensis

Geographic range
V. eriwanensis is found in Armenia, northwestern Iran, and northeastern Turkey.

Habitat

Reproduction
V. eriwanensis is ovoviviparous. Litter size may be as large as ten.

Etymology
The subspecific name, ebneri, is in honor of Austrian entomologist Richard Ebner.

References

Further reading
Knoepffler P, Sochurek E (1955). "Neues über die Rassen der Wiesenotter (Vipera ursinii BONAP)". Burgenländische Heimatblätter 17 (4): 185–188. (Vipera ursinii ebneri, new subspecies, pp. 185–186). (in German).
Nilson G, Tuniyev B, Andrén C, Orlov N (1999). "Vipers of Caucasus: Taxonomic considerations". Kaupia, Darmstadt (8): 103–106. (Vipera eriwanensis, new taxonomic status, p. 104).
Reuss T (1933). "Fortzetzung und Schluss der Originalberichte". Nachrichtenblatt für Aquarien- und Terrarien-Vereine, Berlin 1933: 372–373. (Acridophaga renardi eriwanensis, new subspecies). (in German).
Sindaco R, Venchi A, Grieco C (2013). The Reptiles of the Westen Palearctic 2. Annotated checklist and distributional atlas of the snakes of Europe, North Africa, Middle East and Central Asia, with an update to the Vol. 1. (Monographs of the Societas Herpetologica Italica). Latina, Italy: Edizioni Belvedere. 543 pp. .

Reptiles described in 1933
Reptiles of Armenia
Reptiles of Iran
Reptiles of Turkey
eriwanensis